A flip-over is one of five types of poison pills in which current shareholders of a targeted firm will have the option to purchase discounted stock after the potential takeover. Introduced in late 1984 and adopted by many firms, the strategy gave a common stock dividend in the form of rights to acquire the firm's common stock or preferred stock under market value. Following a takeover, the rights would "flip over" and allow the current shareholder to purchase the unfriendly competitor's shares at a discount. If this tool is exercised, the number of shares held by the unfriendly competitors will realize dilution and price devaluation.

See also
 Mergers and Acquisitions
 Takeover
 Industrial organization

Footnotes

References

Mergers and acquisitions